Michel Menu (February 3, 1916, in Secondigny, Deux-Sèvres – March 2, 2015 in Saint-Cloud, Hauts-de-Seine), was a French engineer and author. A major figure of Catholic Scouting, he was the Deputy Chief Commissioner, National Scout Commissioner of Scouts de France (1946-1956), and launched the Raider-Scouts scheme in 1948.

Works 

 Bases fondamentales du scoutisme (with Pierre Delsuc, Pierre de Montjamont and Henry Dhavernas), 1967

References

Scouting and Guiding in France
1916 births
2015 deaths